Tân Hiệp may refer to several places in Vietnam, including:

Tân Hiệp District, a rural district of Kiên Giang Province
Tân Hiệp, Biên Hòa, a ward of Biên Hòa in Đồng Nai Province
Tân Hiệp, Tân Uyên, a ward of Tân Uyên, Bình Dương
Tân Hiệp, Kiên Giang, a township and capital of Tân Hiệp District
Tân Hiệp, Tiền Giang, a township and capital of Châu Thành District, Tiền Giang
Tân Hiệp, Hóc Môn, a commune of Hóc Môn District in Ho Chi Minh City
Tân Hiệp, Quảng Nam, a commune of Hội An
Tân Hiệp, Bắc Giang, a commune of Yên Thế District
Tân Hiệp, Phú Giáo, a commune of Phú Giáo District in Bình Dương Province
Tân Hiệp, Bình Phước, a commune of Hớn Quản District
Tân Hiệp, Long Thành, a commune of Long Thành District in Đồng Nai Province
Tân Hiệp, Long An, a commune of Thạnh Hóa District
Tân Hiệp, Tây Ninh, a commune of Tân Châu District, Tây Ninh
Tân Hiệp, Trà Vinh, a commune of Trà Cú District

See also
Ngã Bảy town of Hậu Giang Province was named Tân Hiệp from its creation in 2005 to late 2006
The communes of Tân Hiệp A and Tân Hiệp B in Tân Hiệp District